4/8 may refer to:
April 8 (month-day date notation)
August 4 (day-month date notation)